Daniele Zappaterra (born 19 September 1955) is an Italian boxer. He competed in the men's light welterweight event at the 1976 Summer Olympics.

References

1955 births
Living people
Italian male boxers
Olympic boxers of Italy
Boxers at the 1976 Summer Olympics
Light-welterweight boxers